Ballinaglera, officially Ballinagleragh, is a village in County Leitrim. It is on the R207 regional road east of Lough Allen.

Sport
Ballinaglera GAA is the local GAA club.

See also
 List of towns and villages in Ireland

References

Towns and villages in County Leitrim